New World Stages is a five-theater, Off-Broadway performing arts complex in the Hell's Kitchen neighborhood of Manhattan in New York City. It is between 49th and 50th Streets beneath the plaza of the Worldwide Plaza complex at Eighth Avenue.

History
Constructed on the site of the third Madison Square Garden, New World Stages was originally built as a Loews Cineplex Entertainment multiplex cinema at Worldwide Plaza. The Worldwide Cinemas multiplex opened in June 1989 and was originally operated by the Cineplex Odeon Corporation. The Loews Cineplex at Worldwide Plaza closed in early 2001 after its operator went bankrupt. The former multiplex temporarily served as office space for accounting firm Deloitte later that year after that firm's offices were destroyed in the September 11 attacks.

Dodger Stage Holding Theatricals leased the complex in 2002 with plans to convert the former six-screen multiplex into five Off-Broadway stages. The movie theater complex reopened as Dodger Stages in 2004 following substantial renovations. The architects were Beyer Blinder Belle, the theatre designers were Sachs Morgan, and the interior designer was Klara Zieglerova. Since that time, the theater complex has housed many commercial theatrical productions, as well as numerous corporate events, readings, and concerts. Dodger Stages was renamed New World Stages on March 16, 2006, concurrent with Stage Entertainment’s assuming sole ownership of the complex. Since November 17, 2014, the venue has been owned and operated by The Shubert Organization.

In addition to new Off-Broadway productions, New World Stages has become a home to shows that were previously on Broadway, including Avenue Q, The 39 Steps, Million Dollar Quartet, Peter and the Starcatcher, and Jersey Boys. This producing tactic has been utilized to encourage the extension of a show's commercial run. The venue has also become a location for the piggybacking model, whereby multiple shows adjust their playing times and share the same theater, set, and tech personnel to lower the costs of keeping an open-ended Off-Broadway show running. The theatres and lobby are also available for special events, including conferences, readings, workshops and receptions.

Statistics
New World Stages houses five theaters. Stages 1 and 3 have a maximum of 499 seats each, Stages 2 and 4 have a maximum of 350 seats each, and Stage 5 has a maximum of 199 seats. These capacities, greater than 100, fewer than 500, define New World Stages as an Off-Broadway complex. (Theaters with fewer than 100 seats are Off-Off-Broadway; theaters with 500 or more seats that are in the theater district are classified as Broadway level.) The maximum weekly capacity, assuming five shows running concurrently in the five theaters, each for eight performances per week, is 15,176 people.

The complete square footage of the underground complex is 61,300 square feet (5,690 m2), and it reaches underground the length of a full city block, from 49th Street to 50th Street.

Show history
The following information is taken from the Internet Off-Broadway Database. New World Stages has been home to a variety of Off-Broadway shows in its brief history, ranging in theme from a water based puppet show to a zombie musical. Current productions are in bold.

Stage 1
499 Seats

 The Great American Trailer Park Musical, August 20, 2005 – December 4, 2005
 Evil Dead the Musical, October 2, 2006 – February 17, 2007
 Elvis People, June 6, 2007 – June 23, 2007
 Die, Mommie, Die!, October 9, 2007 – January 13, 2008
 Jackie Mason: The Ultimate Jew, March 18, 2008 – July 20, 2008
 Rock of Ages, October 1, 2008 – January 4, 2009
 The Toxic Avenger, March 18, 2009 – January 3, 2010
 The 39 Steps, March 25, 2010 – January 16, 2011
 Between Worlds (Entre Mundos), March 4, 2011 – April 24, 2011
 Rent, July 14, 2011 – September 9, 2012
 Peter and the Starcatcher, March 18, 2013 – January 12, 2014
 Heathers: The Musical, March 17, 2014 – August 4, 2014
 Nevermore: The Imaginary Life and Mysterious Death of Edgar Allan Poe, January 14, 2015 – March 29, 2015
 Tappin' Thru Life, December 23, 2015 – February 21, 2016
 iLuminate, November 22, 2016 – January 8, 2017
 Building the Wall, May 12, 2017 - June 4, 2017
 Jersey Boys, November 22, 2017 – May 22, 2022
 Melissa Etheridge My Window - A Journey Through Life, October 13, 2022 - October 29, 2022 Fidler Afn Dakh, November 13, 2022 – January 1, 2023

Stage 2
350 Seats
Pieces (of Ass), December 7, 2004 – March 27, 2005
Drumstruck, May 12, 2005 – November 12, 2006
Bill W. and Dr. Bob, February 16, 2007 – June 10, 2007
Celia, August 28, 2007 – May 25, 2008
Flamingo Court, July 17, 2008 – September 28, 2008
Rooms – A Rock Romance, February 27, 2009 – May 10, 2009Gazillion Bubble Show, September 2009 – Present (moved from Stage 3)
Voca People, February 16, 2012 – September 2, 2012
Jackie Hoffman's A Chanukah Carol, December 8, 2012 - December 29, 2012
Greed: A Musical for Our Times, March 19, 2014 - April 19, 2014
Blank! The Musical, November 1, 2014 - November 30, 2014
Men are from Mars, Women are from Venus LIVE!, October 22, 2015 – November 29, 2015
One Funny Mother, March 31, 2016 – January 7, 2017Katsura Sunshine's Rakugo, September 19, 2019 – PresentStage 3
499 Seats
Mandy Patinkin in Concert, September 20, 2004 – October 28, 2004
Modern Orthodox, November 11, 2004 – May 8, 2005
A Mother, A Daughter, and A Gun, October 14, 2005 – November 27, 2007
Burleigh Grime$, May 23, 2006 – July 16, 2006
Mimi le Duck, November 6, 2006 – December 3, 2006
Gazillion Bubble Show, January 17, 2007 – September 2009 (moved to Stage 2)
Avenue Q, October 9, 2009 – May 26, 2019
Rock of Ages, June 19, 2019 – March 11, 2020
A Sherlock Carol, November 11, 2021 – January 2, 2022
¡Americano!, March 31, 2022 – June 19, 2022
A Sherlock Carol, November 21, 2022 – January 1, 2023
 Dog Man: The Musical, March 4, 2023 - April 30, 2023

Stage 4
350 Seats
The Immigrant, October 8, 2004 - November 28, 2004
Altar Boyz, February 15, 2005 – January 10, 2010
Naked Boys Singing, October 14, 2005 – January 28, 2012
White's Lies, April 12, 2010 – June 13, 2010
Freckleface Strawberry, October 1, 2010 – April 24, 2011
Jump, May 11, 2011 - June 12, 2011
Million Dollar Quartet, July 28, 2011 – June 24, 2012
Bullet for Adolf, July 19, 2012 – September 30, 2012
Bare the musical, November 19, 2012 – February 3, 2013
iLuminate, June 24, 2013 – January 18, 2015
Clinton: The Musical, March 25, 2015 – June 21, 2015
Shear Madness, October 22, 2015 – July 10, 2016
Not That Jewish, October 6, 2016 – April 30, 2017
The Government Inspector, July 5, 2017 - August 20, 2017
A Clockwork Orange, September 2, 2017 - December 2, 2017
Desperate Measures, May 30, 2018 – October 28, 2018
The Play That Goes Wrong, February 11, 2019 – Present

Stage 5
199 Seats
Symphonie Fantastique: August 31, 2004 – January 2, 2005
The Musical of Musicals (The Musical!), February 2, 2005 – November 13, 2005
Christine Jorgensen Reveals, December 29, 2005 – January 18, 2006
Sidd: A New Musical, February 23, 2006 – March 26, 2006
How to Save the World and Find True Love in 90 Minutes, November 4, 2006 – December 31, 2006
Sealed for Freshness, February 15, 2007 – April 29, 2007
My First Time, July 12, 2007 – January 22, 2010
The All-American Sport of Bi-Partisan Bashing, August 6, 2007 – October 14, 2007
Make Me a Song, October 30, 2007 – December 30, 2007
Pinkalicious, the Musical, January 12, 2008 – September 21, 2008
Tim Minchin, March 5, 2008 – April 12, 2008
The Castle, March 30, 2008 – May 23, 2009
East 14th, June 26, 2008 – September 6, 2008
What's That Smell: The Music of Jacob Sterling, November 1, 2008 – December 28, 2008
Flamingo Court, April 18, 2009 – July 19, 2009
For Lovers Only (Love Songs...Nothing But Love Songs, April 24, 2009 – August 3, 2009
Love Child, October 23, 2009 – January 3, 2010
The Temperamentals, February 18, 2010 – May 30, 2010
John Tartaglia's ImaginOcean, March 17, 2010 – September 4, 2011
Devil Boys from Beyond, November 3, 2010 – December 4, 2010
La Barberia, February 3, 2011 – June 12, 2011
Freud's Last Session, October 7, 2011 – July 22, 2012
In the Bar of a Tokyo Hotel, October 13, 2012 – October 28, 2012
Forever Dusty, November 11, 2012 – April 7, 2013
The Two-Character Play, June 13, 2013 – September 29, 2013
Murder for Two, November 6, 2013 – June 29, 2014
Stalking the Bogeyman, September 12, 2014 – November 9, 2014
Churchill, February 6, 2015 – July 12, 2015
Would You Still Love Me If..., October 10, 2015 – October 26, 2015
Mad Libs Live!, November 1, 2015 – January 3, 2016
Real Men: The Musical, November 12, 2015 – December 12, 2015
The Woodsman, January 27, 2016 – May 29, 2016
A Class Act, July 9, 2016 – August 28, 2016
Verso, September 19, 2016 – November 27, 2016
Church & State, March 3, 2017 – June 4, 2017
Puffs, or: Seven Increasingly Eventful Years at a Certain School of Magic and Magic, July 8, 2017 – August 18, 2019
MsTRIAL, November 14, 2019 – February 2, 2020
Drift, February 29, 2020 – March 11, 2020
The Alchemist, November 7, 2021 – December 15, 2021
Little Girl Blue, March 5, 2022 – May 29, 2022
Without You, January 14, 2023 – Present

The Green Room

The Green Room is a bar and lounge area located downstairs at New World Stages. Drinks bought from The Green Room are allowed to be brought into the theaters.

From October 14, 2016 through March 11, 2020, The Green Room was home to The Imbible: A Spirited History of Drinking.

References

External links
 
 
 
 
 
 
 

Theatrical organizations in the United States
Theatres in Manhattan
Off-Broadway theaters
Hell's Kitchen, Manhattan
Theatres completed in 2004